The women's nanquan three events combined competition (Nanquan, Nandao and Nangun) at the 2002 Asian Games in Busan, South Korea was held from 11 to 13 October at the Dongseo University Minseok Sports Center.

Schedule
All times are Korea Standard Time (UTC+09:00)

Results

References

2002 Asian Games Report, Page 796
Results

Women's nanquan